Vinícius Lopes may refer to:
Vinícius Lopes Righi (born 1964), known as Vinícius, Brazilian football forward
Vinícius Lopes (footballer, born 1988), Brazilian football forward
Vinícius Lopes Laurindo (born 1990), known as Neguete, Brazilian football defender
Vinícius Lopes (footballer, born 1999), Brazilian football forward